William Knell may refer to:

 William Knell (actor) (died 1587), Elizabethan English actor
 William Adolphus Knell (1801–1875), British maritime painter
 William Calcott Knell (1830–1880), British landscape painter